Chełmno (older ; formerly ) is a town in northern Poland near the Vistula river with 18,915 inhabitants as of December 2021. It is the seat of the Chełmno County in the Kuyavian-Pomeranian Voivodeship.

Due to its regional importance in the Middle Ages, the city gave its name to the entire area, Chełmno Land (and later an administrative unit of the Kingdom of Poland, the Chełmno Voivodeship), the local Catholic diocese and Kulm law, which was used to found cities and towns around Poland, including the current capital city of Warsaw.

Name 

The city's name Chełmno comes from chelm, the old Polish word for hill. After the area was granted to the Teutonic Knights as a Polish fief in 1232, the Germanized name Kulm was used in official documents regarding the town, as the city was a member of the Hanseatic League and part of the State of the Teutonic Order. Chełmno was annexed by Prussia in the First Partition of Poland in 1772 and, as part of a larger Germanization effort, it was officially renamed Kulm. During the German occupation in World War II, the town was again renamed from Chełmno to Kulm.

History 

The first written mention of Chełmno is known from a document allegedly issued in 1065 by Duke Bolesław II the Generous of Poland for the Benedictine monastery in Mogilno. In 1226 Duke Konrad I of Masovia invited the Teutonic Knights to Chełmno Land. In 1233 Kulm was granted city rights known as "Kulm law" (renewed in 1251), the model system for over 200 Polish towns. The town was made the nominal see of the Roman Catholic Diocese of Chełmno under the archbishop of Riga by the papal legate William of Modena in 1243 (however, the cathedral and the residence of the bishop were located actually in the adjacent Chełmża). The town grew prosperous as a member of the mercantile Hanseatic League.

Kulm and Chełmno Land were part of the Teutonic Knights' state until 1454. In 1440, the town was one of the founding members of the Prussian Confederation, which opposed Teutonic rule, and upon the request of which King Casimir IV Jagiellon reincorporated the territory to the Kingdom of Poland in 1454. In May 1454 the town pledged allegiance to the Polish King in Toruń. After the end of the Thirteen Years' War, the Teutonic Knights renounced claims to the town, and recognized it as part of Poland. It was made the capital of Chełmno Voivodeship. After dissolution of the Archdiocese of Riga in 1566, the bishops of Chełmno attended the councils of the Ecclesiastical province of the metropolitan of Gniezno. This practice was recognised by the Holy See by the Bull De salute animarum in 1821, when Chełmno diocese became de jure a suffragan of the Archdiocese of Gniezno. Chełmno diocese was enlarged on that occasion (Górzno, Krajna and Działdowo). In 1692, the local gymnasium was transformed into the Chełmno Academy (Akademia Chełmińska), which in 1756 became a branch of the Jagiellonian University in Kraków, the oldest and leading Polish university. Grzegorz Gerwazy Gorczycki, one of the greatest Polish Baroque composers, was a lecturer at the Academy in the 1690s.

In 1772, following the First Partition of Poland, the town was annexed by the Kingdom of Prussia. Between 1807 and 1815 Chełmno was part of the short-lived Polish Duchy of Warsaw, being re-annexed by Prussia at the end of the Napoleonic Wars.

As Kulm, it had been a garrison town. In 1776 Frederick the Great founded here a cadet school which was to serve in Germanising Polish areas and nobility. In 1890 the garrison included 561 military staff. On 1 October 1890 the cadet school was moved to Koszalin (then Köslin) in Pomerania. Also as part of anti-Polish policies, the Prussians expelled the Kraków professors from Chełmno, abolished the local Polish academy, and closed down Catholic monasteries. Poles were subjected to various repressions, local Polish newspapers were confiscated.

Renown Polish surgeon Ludwik Rydygier opened his private clinic in the town in 1878, where he conducted pioneering surgical operations, including the first in Poland and second in the world surgical removal of the pylorus in a patient suffering from stomach cancer in 1880 and the first in the world peptic ulcer resection in 1881. Rydygier sold the clinic to one of his employees, Leon Polewski, in 1887, due to harassment from the Prussian authorities.

On January 22, 1920 Polish troops were greeted by a large crowd of residents and Chełmno was reintegrated with Poland, which regained independence after World War I.

When World War II broke out in 1939, Nazi German authorities murdered 5,000 Polish civilians upon taking control of the territory. The atrocities took place in Klamry, Małe Czyste, Podwiesk, Płutowo, Dąbrowa Chełmińska, and Wielkie Łunawy, while many other Poles were executed in forests.  A number of Chelmno citizens are interviewed about these events in the documentary film Shoah (1985). The rest of the Polish population was expelled to the General Government in the more eastern part of German-occupied Poland in line with the German policy of Lebensraum. Polish Secret State resistance groups such as Polska Żyje ("Poland Lives"), Rota, Grunwald, and Szare Szeregi were also active in the area. The area was administered as part of Reichsgau Danzig-West Prussia and served as the seat of the district/county (kreis) of Kulm.

On 25 January 1945 German forces set fire to several buildings in the city, including a hospital, a railway terminal, and a brewery, while retreating (see scorched earth).

The town was administratively part of the Toruń Voivodeship from 1975 to 1998.

Demographics

Since its founding, the city had a mixed population of Poles and Germans, with the former making ⅔ of its population in the second half of the 19th century.

Main sights 

Chełmno has a well-preserved medieval center, with five Gothic churches and a beautiful Renaissance town hall in the middle of the market square.

The Old Town is one of Poland's official national Historic Monuments (Pomnik historii), as designated 20 April 2005, and tracked by the National Heritage Board of Poland.

Gothic churches:
Church of St Mary, former main parochial church of town, built 1280-1320 (with St. Valentine relic)
Church of Saints James and Nicholas, former Franciscan church, from the 14th century, rebuilt in the 19th century
Church of Saints Peter and Paul, former Dominican church, from the 13th and 14th centuries, rebuilt in the 18th and 19th centuries
Church of Saints John the Baptist and Johns the Evangelist, former Benedictine and Cistercian nuns' church, with monastery, built 1290-1330
Church of Holy Ghost, from 1280–90
  Town hall, whose oldest part comes from the end of the 13th century, rebuilt in manneristic style (under Italian influence) in 1567-1572
City walls which surround whole city, preserved almost as a whole, with watch towers and Grudziądzka Gate
Arsenal building constructed in 1811, now the seat of public library in Chełmno
Baroque building of the Chełmno Academy, reconstructed in the 19th century
Park Planty
Monument of Ludwik Rydygier

Chełmno gives its name to the protected area called Chełmno Landscape Park, which stretches along the right bank of the Vistula.

Notable residents 

 Brunon Bendig (1938–2006), amateur boxer
 Adam Cieśliński (born 1982), footballer
 Friedrich-Carl Cranz (1886–1941), general
 Hans Dominik (1870–1910), colonial officer
 Roderich von Erckert (1821-1900), ethnographer
 Friedrich Fülleborn (1866–1933), physician and tropical disease specialist
 Grzegorz Gerwazy Gorczycki (ca. 1665–1734), Polish Baroque composer, lecturer at the Chełmno Academy
 Heinz Guderian (1888–1954), German general, blitzkrieg and tank theorist
 Hyacinth (Jacek) Gulski (1847-1911), Roman Catholic Priest, leader of the Polish Diaspora in the United States, particularly in Milwaukee
 Wojciech Stanisław Leski (1702–1758), Bishop of Chelmno
 Hermann Löns (1866–1914), writer
 Ernst Wilhelm Lotz (1890–1914), writer
 Michael Otto (born 1943), entrepreneur
 Franciszek Raszeja (1896–1942), doctor
 Leon Raszeja (1901–1939), lawyer
 Maksymilian Raszeja (1889–1939), theologian
 Ludwik Rydygier (1850–1920), renown surgeon and professor of medicine
 Antoni Grabowski (1857–1921), chemical engineer, Esperanto activist
 Georg Salzberger (1882–1975), Jewish rabbi
 Walter Schilling (1895–1943), Wehrmacht general
 Kurt Schumacher (1895–1952), German politician
 Max Sperling (1905–1984), Wehrmacht officer 
 Max Stirner (1806–1856), philosopher
 Adolf Wach (1843–1926), German jurist
 Jakub Zabłocki (1984–2015), footballer

Gallery

See also 
List of cities and towns in Poland

References

External links 
 "Shoah (Film) Interview with Gustav Laabs" - Interview

Cities and towns in Kuyavian-Pomeranian Voivodeship
Chełmno County
Populated places on the Vistula
Pomeranian Voivodeship (1919–1939)
Kulm law
Nazi war crimes in Poland